Keräsjoki is a river in Norrland in Sweden.

References

Drainage basins of the Baltic Sea
Rivers of Norrbotten County